Caenopedina hawaiiensis is a species of sea urchins of the Family Pedinidae. Their armor is covered with spines. Caenopedina hawaiiensis was first scientifically described in 1912 by Hubert Lyman Clark.

References

Animals described in 1912
Pedinoida
Taxa named by Hubert Lyman Clark